GGP Inc. (an initialism of General Growth Properties) was an American commercial real estate company and the second-largest shopping mall operator in the United States. It was founded by brothers Martin, Matthew and Maurice Bucksbaum in Cedar Rapids, Iowa in 1954, and was headquartered in Chicago, Illinois from 2000. It was subject to the largest real estate bankruptcy in American history at the time of its filing in 2009.

GGP was acquired by Brookfield Property Partners, and management of its portfolio was transferred to Brookfield Properties, in 2018.

History

20th century
General Growth was founded in Iowa by three brothers, Martin, Matthew and Maurice Bucksbaum, in 1954 as General Management. That year, they borrowed $1.2 million to develop their first shopping center, Town & Country Shopping Center in Cedar Rapids, Iowa, in order to open a fourth location for the grocery store founded by their father.

By 1964, the company owned 5 malls and moved its headquarters to Des Moines, Iowa. In 1970, General Management became General Growth Properties (GGP) and became a public company via an initial public offering. In 1984, the company sold its holdings to Equitable Real Estate Investment Management for $800 million in the largest-ever single-asset real estate transaction to date, but retained the property management of the assets. In 1989, the company acquired Center Companies, creating the fourth-largest shopping center management company in the United States.

In 1993, the company once again became a public company via an initial public offering, raising $400 million. In 1994, the company purchased a 40% interest in Centermark Properties from Prudential Financial. In 1995, the company sold 25% of its 40% stake, yielding a profit of over $100 million. In 1995, the company also purchased the Homart Development Company from Sears for $1.85 billion. In 1995, co-founder and CEO Martin Bucksbaum died and the company moved its headquarters from Des Moines to Chicago. In 1999, John Bucksbaum succeeded his father as CEO.

21st century

In 2000, the company moved its headquarters from Des Moines to Chicago. The company occupied a historic building on North Wacker Drive designed by architectural firm Graham, Anderson, Probst & White, that was later demolished. In 2004, the company acquired The Rouse Company, which owned 37 regional shopping malls and Howard Hughes Corporation, a land development company, for $7.2 billion in cash. By 2008, the company had taken on $25 billion in debt and the company was facing required debt payments. John Bucksbaum was ousted as CEO, though he remained chairman of the board, and Adam Metz was named CEO. In December 2008, hedge fund manager Bill Ackman disclosed a 25% ownership stake in the company.

In 2009, the company missed a deadline to repay $900 million in loans backed by two Las Vegas properties, putting the company in danger of filing for bankruptcy protection. At that point, the stock price was down 98% in 12 months. The Bucksbaum family's stake in the firm, which was worth $2.5 billion in 2005, had declined in value by a similar amount. On April 16, 2009, the company filed one of the largest real estate bankruptcies ever and received $375 million in debtor-in-possession financing from Pershing Square Capital Management, the hedge fund managed by Bill Ackman. In February 2010, Brookfield Asset Management made a $2.625 billion equity investment in the company. In November 2010, the company exited bankruptcy protection. Creditors were paid in full and equity holders made a "substantial" recovery of their investment, both of which are unusual in bankruptcy filings. In conjunction with the reorganization, the company spun off Howard Hughes Corporation to its shareholders.

In December 2010, CEO Adam Metz and President and COO Thomas Nolan left the company and Sandeep Mathrani, formerly the head of the retail division of Vornado Realty Trust, was named CEO. In 2011, the company sold Faneuil Hall for $140 million. In January 2012, the company completed the spin off of Rouse Properties to its shareholders. In 2013, co-founder Matthew Bucksbaum died. In February 2014, Bill Ackman sold his remaining shares in the company back to the company for $556 million. In April 2015, the company acquired the Crown Building for $1.78 billion. In January 2017, the company changed its name to GGP Inc.

2018 acquisition by Brookfield Property Partners
On August 28, 2018, GGP was acquired by Brookfield Property Partners and management of its former portfolio was transferred to its Brookfield Properties subsidiary for $9 billion in cash. The transaction reunited the malls spun off in the Rouse Properties spinoff with the GGP malls. Upon closing the acquisition, Brookfield immediately sold a 49% interest in each of three former GGP super-regional malls to CBRE Group, and a 49% interest in three other former GGP malls to TIAA subsidiary Nuveen, seeking additional joint ventures for its newly-acquired malls.

See also
 List of Brookfield Properties shopping malls

References

External links
 Official website, archived on August 28, 2018

1954 establishments in Iowa
American companies established in 1954
 
Bucksbaum family
Companies based in Chicago
Real estate companies established in 1954
Companies that filed for Chapter 11 bankruptcy in 2009
Shopping center management firms
Real estate investment trusts of the United States
1993 initial public offerings
2018 mergers and acquisitions